Monroe Township may refer to:

Arkansas 
 Monroe Township, Mississippi County, Arkansas, in Mississippi County, Arkansas
 Monroe Township, Sevier County, Arkansas, in Sevier County, Arkansas

Illinois 
 Monroe Township, Ogle County, Illinois

Indiana 
 Monroe Township, Adams County, Indiana
 Monroe Township, Allen County, Indiana
 Monroe Township, Carroll County, Indiana
 Monroe Township, Clark County, Indiana
 Monroe Township, Delaware County, Indiana
 Monroe Township, Grant County, Indiana
 Monroe Township, Howard County, Indiana
 Monroe Township, Jefferson County, Indiana
 Monroe Township, Kosciusko County, Indiana
 Monroe Township, Madison County, Indiana
 Monroe Township, Morgan County, Indiana
 Monroe Township, Pike County, Indiana
 Monroe Township, Pulaski County, Indiana
 Monroe Township, Putnam County, Indiana
 Monroe Township, Randolph County, Indiana
 Monroe Township, Washington County, Indiana

Iowa 
 Monroe Township, Benton County, Iowa
 Monroe Township, Butler County, Iowa
 Monroe Township, Fremont County, Iowa
 Monroe Township, Johnson County, Iowa
 Monroe Township, Linn County, Iowa
 Monroe Township, Madison County, Iowa
 Monroe Township, Mahaska County, Iowa
 Monroe Township, Monroe County, Iowa
 Monroe Township, Ringgold County, Iowa
 Monroe Township, Shelby County, Iowa, in Shelby County, Iowa
 Monroe Township, Wayne County, Iowa

Kansas 
 Monroe Township, Anderson County, Kansas

Michigan 
 Monroe Township, Michigan, in Newaygo County
 Monroe Charter Township, Michigan, in Monroe County
 Munro Township, Michigan, in Cheboygan County

Minnesota 
 Monroe Township, Lyon County, Minnesota

Missouri 
 Monroe Township, Andrew County, Missouri
 Monroe Township, Daviess County, Missouri
 Monroe Township, Lincoln County, Missouri
 Monroe Township, Livingston County, Missouri
 Monroe Township, Monroe County, Missouri
 Monroe Township, Nodaway County, Missouri

Nebraska 
 Monroe Township, Platte County, Nebraska

New Jersey 
 Monroe Township, Gloucester County, New Jersey
 Monroe Township, Middlesex County, New Jersey

North Carolina 
 Monroe Township, Guilford County, North Carolina, in Guilford County, North Carolina
 Monroe Township, Union County, North Carolina, in Union County, North Carolina

North Dakota 
 Monroe Township, Towner County, North Dakota, in Towner County, North Dakota

Ohio 
 Monroe Township, Adams County, Ohio
 Monroe Township, Allen County, Ohio
 Monroe Township, Ashtabula County, Ohio
 Monroe Township, Carroll County, Ohio
 Monroe Township, Clermont County, Ohio
 Monroe Township, Coshocton County, Ohio
 Monroe Township, Darke County, Ohio
 Monroe Township, Guernsey County, Ohio
 Monroe Township, Harrison County, Ohio
 Monroe Township, Henry County, Ohio
 Monroe Township, Holmes County, Ohio
 Monroe Township, Knox County, Ohio
 Monroe Township, Licking County, Ohio
 Monroe Township, Logan County, Ohio
 Monroe Township, Madison County, Ohio
 Monroe Township, Miami County, Ohio
 Monroe Township, Muskingum County, Ohio
 Monroe Township, Perry County, Ohio
 Monroe Township, Pickaway County, Ohio
 Monroe Township, Preble County, Ohio
 Monroe Township, Putnam County, Ohio
 Monroe Township, Richland County, Ohio

Pennsylvania 
 Monroe Township, Bedford County, Pennsylvania
 Monroe Township, Bradford County, Pennsylvania
 Monroe Township, Clarion County, Pennsylvania
 Monroe Township, Cumberland County, Pennsylvania
 Monroe Township, Juniata County, Pennsylvania
 Monroe Township, Snyder County, Pennsylvania 
 Monroe Township, Wyoming County, Pennsylvania

South Dakota 
 Monroe Township, Turner County, South Dakota, in Turner County, South Dakota

Township name disambiguation pages